Rhagovelia magdalena is a species of aquatic bug first found in Vereda La Vega, Río Magdalena, Oporapa, Huila, Colombia.

References

Further reading
 MOREIRA, FELIPE FERRAZ FIGUEIREDO, et al. "Two new species of Rhagovelia (Hemiptera: Heteroptera: Veliidae) from Costa Rica, with a key and new records from the country." Zootaxa 3980.4 (2015): 477-500.

Veliidae
Arthropods of Colombia
Endemic fauna of Colombia
Magdalena River
Insects described in 2011